Berrien City, also known simply as Berrien, is an unincorporated community located within West Windsor Township in Mercer County, New Jersey, United States. The area is located within the Princeton Junction census designated place centered about the intersection of Alexander Road and Scott Avenue, located within walking distance of the Princeton Junction train station and Princeton-Hightstown Road (County Route 571). It was developed as an upper-middle class development after World War I and features homes constructed about 100 years ago. Most of the homes still exist with some small businesses located along Alexander Road with the West Windsor Arts Center operating its facilities out of the former Princeton Junction Fire Company fire station.

References

West Windsor, New Jersey
Unincorporated communities in Mercer County, New Jersey
Unincorporated communities in New Jersey